USS Hale may refer to the following ships of the United States Navy:

 , a  launched in 1919; transferred to the Royal Navy as HMS Caldwell (I20), 1940; to the Royal Canadian Navy, 1942; scrapped in 1944
 , a  launched in 1943; transferred to Colombia as ARC Antioquia (DD-01), 1961; struck in 1973 and scrapped

See also
 * Hale, a gunboat that fought alongside the Union Navy forces in the capture of Jacksonville, Florida, during the American Civil War. There is nearly nothing known of this Hale other than its existence. It has been postulated that this vessel was a privateer instead of a commissioned warship.
 
 
 

United States Navy ship names